Tolu A. Akinyemi is a multi-award-winning Nigerian writer and poet best known for his poetry collection, Dead Lions Don't Roar.

Early life and education
Akinyemi was born Tolulope Adeola Akinyemi in Ado-Ekiti. He is a trained Economist with a degree from Ekiti State University and a master's degree in Accounting and Financial Management from University of Hertfordshire, Hatfield, United Kingdom.

Career 
Akinyemi moved from Nigeria to the UK in 2010 and has since published fourteen books. Akinyemi released his debut book of poetry, Dead Lions Don't Roar, in 2017.

Akinyemi released Dead Dogs Don't Bark, his second book of poetry and third book in 2018. It was followed by Dead Cats Don't Meow, which was released in April 2019 and featured a multi-national book tour of the UK and Nigeria.

Akinyemi's books have been released both in print and online. His poems have been analysed as being "poetry of uplift" by the journal of English Studies in Africa. 

Akinyemi is also a performance poet and has headlined at Great Northern Slam, Crossing The Tyne Festival, Feltonbury Arts and Music Festival, The Havering Literary Festival.. He was the guest poet at Havering Libraries Black History Month event in October 2021 and has previously headlined at Woolwich Centre Library National Poetry Day event in October 2018. 

He was endorsed as a writer with exceptional talent by the Arts Council England.

Honours and awards 
In 2020, he won the Best Indie Book Award for his poetry collection, A Booktiful Love. His collection of short stories, Inferno of Silence,  won the 2021 IRDA Discovery Award for short stories and Next Generation Indie Book Awards (2021) for Best Cover Design (Fiction).

Philanthropy 
Since 2017, Akinyemi has donated a percentage from the proceeds of his books to charity. He supported the Age UK Northumberland's friendship line campaign with £1000.

Bibliography 
 Dead Lions Don't Roar: A collection of poetic wisdom for the discerning 
Unravel your Hidden Gems  T & B Global Concepts Ltd (April 2018)
 Dead Dogs Don't Bark   T & B Global Concepts Ltd (September 2018)
 Dead Cats Don't Meow – Don't waste the ninth life.  T & B Global Concepts Ltd (April 2019)
Never Play Games With The Devil  The Roaring Lion Newcastle LTD (August 2019)
A Booktiful Love  The Roaring Lion Newcastle LTD (May 8, 2020)
 Inferno of Silence  The Roaring Lion Newcastle LTD (May 7, 2020)
 Black # Inferior  The Roaring Lion Newcastle LTD (Jan 1, 2021)
 Never Marry a Writer  The Roaring Lion Newcastle LTD (2021)
 Everybody Don Kolomental  The Roaring Lion Newcastle LTD (Apr 1, 2021)
I am Not a Troublemaker ASIN : B096H3W6JK Publisher : The Roaring Lion Newcastle Ltd. (June 1, 2021)
I Wear Self-Confidence Like a Second Skin  ASIN : B0968SVC6M Publisher : The Roaring Lion Newcastle LTD. (May 30, 2021)
Born in Lockdown: Amazon.co.uk: Akinyemi, Tolu A.  9781913636289 Born in Lockdown: Amazon.co.uk. 
A god in a Human Body ASIN : B08ZR7FDKM Publisher : "The Roaring Lion Newcastle" (January 1, 2022)

References 

Living people
Nigerian poets
Ekiti State University alumni
Yoruba poets
Alumni of the University of Hertfordshire
Year of birth missing (living people)
21st-century Nigerian writers
21st-century essayists
21st-century poets
Nigerian essayists
Nigerian writers
Nigerian short story writers